Independent  is the second studio album by Nigerian R&B musician Faze, released on October 5, 2006.

Production
The production of the album was a bit similar to that of the first since he featured some old producers who worked on his first such OJB Jezreel, Cobhams Asuquo, Paul Runz. The album included ID Cabasa, Spankie, Mr Daz and Ja mix to Faze's list of producer with whom he had worked with.
Recording and Mixing engineers include Dr. Fabriz, Jamix, Clement, Jegg and Issac Effien.

Track listing

References
Album sales 
Faze Independent Album

External links
Mynaijanews 
Naijapals 
Allafrica 

2006 albums
Independent Entertainment albums
Faze (musician) albums
Albums produced by OJB Jezreel
Albums produced by Cobhams Asuquo
Albums produced by I.D. Cabasa
2006 in Nigerian music

Independent
pl:Independent
fi:Independent